Vingtaine de Noirmont is one of the four vingtaines of St. Brélade Parish on the Channel Island of Jersey.

Together with Vingtaine du Coin, it forms "St.Brélade No. 1 district" and elects one Deputy.

References 

Noirmont
Saint Brélade